Khayr al-Nisa Begum (Persian: خیرالنساء بیگم; known under the royal title Mahd-i Ulya (مهد علیا), "the highest-ranked cradle") (died 26 July 1579) was an Iranian Mazandarani princess from the Marashi dynasty, who was the wife of the Safavid shah (king) Mohammad Khodabanda (r. 1578–1587) and mother of Abbas I. During the early part of her husband's reign she was a powerful political figure in her own right and governed Iran de facto between February 1578 and July 1579. She gained power with the assassination of Pari Khan Khanum.

Biography

Background
She was the daughter of Mir Abdollah Khan II, the Marashi ruler of the province of Mazandaran, who claimed descent from the fourth Shi'a Imam Zayn al-Abidin. Members of the family had ruled Mazandaran since the mid-14th century. In 1565-6 Mahd-i Ulya fled to the Safavid court after her cousin Mir Sultan-Murad Khan killed her father. Here she was married to Shah Tahmasp I's son Mohammad Khodabanda. Desire for revenge on her father's killer would remain with her for the rest of her life.

Rule
In 1578, on the death of his brother Ismail II, Mohammad Khodabanda became Shah of Iran. Mohammad was a weak-willed ruler and the leading woman at the court, his ruling sister Pari Khan Khanum (who had allied with the all powerful Qizilbash army factions) believed she could easily control him. From the day Mohammad Khobanda was appointed king, Mahd-i Ulya, took control of his affairs. She was knowledgeable of her husband's deficiency and to atone for his lack of uprightness and quality she resolved to try to become the practical ruler of the Safavid state.

Mohammad Khodabanda and Mahd-i Ulya entered the environs of Qazvin on 12 February 1578. This brought an end to the indisputable rule that Pari Khan Khanum had enjoyed for two months and twenty days. Although she was still the effective ruler of the state, she would now meet opposition from Mahd-i Ulya and her allies. When they reached the city, Pari Khan Khanum showed up to gladly receive them with great grandeur and parade, sitting in a golden-spun litter, whilst being guarded by 4,000-5,000 private guards, inner-harem personal assistants and court attendants.

Mahd-i Ulya was continually informed by the welcoming social gatherings in Qazvin about the large amount of influence and power that Pari Khan Khanum held, thus ratifying what she had already been told by Mirza Salman Jaberi, the former vizier of Ismail II. She then realized that as long as Pari Khan Khanum was alive, she would not be able to control the affairs of the Safavid state and become the de facto ruler of the country. She thus began planning to have her killed.

The order was carried out in 12 February 1578, when Khalil Khan Afshar, who had served as Pari Khan Khanum's tutor during the reign of Tahmasp, had her strangled to death. Pari Khan Khanum's powerful uncle, Shamkhal Sultan, was executed shortly after, whilst Ismail II's infant son Shoja al-Din Mohammad Safavi was murdered.

Mahd-i Ulya now assumed effective control of Iran. She was kept informed of all political developments in the country and built up her own network of support by appointing friends and relatives to important posts. She favoured the "Tajiks" (Persians) instead of the Qizilbash. Her chief aims were promoting the career of her elder son Hamza Mirza (at the expense of his brother Abbas) and seeking revenge for her father. Since his killer, Sultan-Murad Khan, had already died, she turned her attention to his son Mirza Khan. Qizilbash leaders had given Mirza Khan a promise of safe-conduct but as he was travelling to the capital Qazvin the queen's supporters seized and killed him.

Downfall
Angered by the queen's actions, the Qizilbash sent a petition to the shah asking him to remove her from power or face revolts. The shah considered sending her into exile but Mahd-i Ulya refused to concede to their demands. Finally, a group of Qizilbash conspirators accused the queen of having a love affair with Adil Giray, brother of the Crimean Tatar Khan, who was being held captive at the Safavid court by Brajan Bodo. They burst into the harem and strangled her and her mother on 26 July 1579.

See also
 List of the mothers of the Safavid Shahs

References

Sources
 
 
 

16th-century Iranian people
Safavid queens consort
People from Mazandaran Province
1579 deaths
Year of birth unknown
Mar'ashis
Mazandarani people
People from Behshahr
16th-century people of Safavid Iran
16th-century Iranian women